Calliostoma elegantulum is a species of sea snail, a marine gastropod mollusk in the family Calliostomatidae.

Description
The buff, imperforate shell has a conical shape. The whorls are plane, encircled by distant elevated violet beaded lines, alternately smaller, the interstices longitudinally striate. The base of the shell is nearly plane, ornamented with 4 violet cinguli. The aperture is subquadrate and white inside. The columella is subtruncate at its base.

References

 Adams, A., 1853. Contributions towards a monograph of the Trochidae, a family of gastropodous Mollusca. Proc. Zool. Soc. Lond., 1851(19):150-192

External links

elegantulum
Gastropods described in 1853